This article is about the particular significance of the year 1876 to Wales and its people.

Incumbents

Lord Lieutenant of Anglesey – William Owen Stanley 
Lord Lieutenant of Brecknockshire – Joseph Bailey, 1st Baron Glanusk
Lord Lieutenant of Caernarvonshire – Edward Douglas-Pennant, 1st Baron Penrhyn 
Lord Lieutenant of Cardiganshire – Edward Pryse
Lord Lieutenant of Carmarthenshire – John Campbell, 2nd Earl Cawdor 
Lord Lieutenant of Denbighshire – William Cornwallis-West  
Lord Lieutenant of Flintshire – Hugh Robert Hughes
Lord Lieutenant of Glamorgan – Christopher Rice Mansel Talbot 
Lord Lieutenant of Merionethshire – Edward Lloyd-Mostyn, 2nd Baron Mostyn
Lord Lieutenant of Monmouthshire – Henry Somerset, 8th Duke of Beaufort
Lord Lieutenant of Montgomeryshire – Sudeley Hanbury-Tracy, 3rd Baron Sudeley
Lord Lieutenant of Pembrokeshire – William Edwardes, 4th Baron Kensington
Lord Lieutenant of Radnorshire – Arthur Walsh, 2nd Baron Ormathwaite 

Bishop of Bangor – James Colquhoun Campbell
Bishop of Llandaff – Alfred Ollivant 
Bishop of St Asaph – Joshua Hughes 
Bishop of St Davids – Basil Jones

Archdruid of the National Eisteddfod of Wales – Clwydfardd (first official holder of the position

Events
January – The Argentine government appoints Antonio Oneto as civil authority over the Welsh colony in Patagonia, the population of which numbers 690.
9 January – The death of John Russell, Viscount Amberley, leaves Bertrand Russell an orphan.
19 May – Sir Edmund Buckley, 1st Baronet, files for bankruptcy in Manchester with debts exceeding £500,000, causing his Dinas Mawddwy estate to be put up for sale.
June – Francis Kilvert becomes vicar of Saint Harmon, Radnorshire.
13 July – Act of Parliament allows the North Wales Narrow Gauge Railways Company to abandon plans for a line between Croesor Junction and Betws-y-Coed.
22 July – Art Treasures & Industrial Exhibition of North Wales & the Border Counties in Wrexham is opened.
19 August – Judge John Johnes is murdered at his home on Dolaucothi Estate by his butler.
2 December – Cardiff RFC plays its first match, against Newport.
18 December – In a mining accident at South Wales Pit, Abertillery, twenty men are killed.

Arts and literature

New books
George Thomas Orlando Bridgeman – History of the Princes of South Wales

Music
Eos Bradwen – Bugeiles yr Wyddfa
Joseph Parry composes the hymn tune Aberystwyth (published 1879) which becomes the basis of the pan-African anthem Nkosi Sikelel' iAfrika

Sport
Football
2 February – Llewelyn Kenrick sets up the Football Association of Wales in a meeting at the Wynnstay Arms hotel in Wrexham, in response to a challenge issued by The Field magazine, to organize an international match between Wales and Scotland or Ireland.
25 March – Wales play first international football match, against Scotland in Glasgow, losing 4–0.
Formation of Caernarfon athletics club, later Caernarfon Town.
Rugby union – Aberavon RFC, Cardiff RFC, Cardigan RFC, Llandaff RFC, Merthyr RFC and Pontypridd RFC are established.

Births

7 March – Edgar Evans, naval petty officer and Antarctic explorer (died 1912)
19 June – Joe Pullman, Wales international rugby union player (died 1955)
22 June – Gwen John, artist (died 1939)
15 July
Jehoida Hodges, Welsh international rugby union player (died 1930)
Jack Rhapps, Dual-code rugby international (died 1950)
24 July – Viv Huzzey, Welsh international rugby union player (died 1929)
18 September – Charles Kemeys-Tynte, 8th Baron Wharton (died 1934)
17 November – Dicky Owen, Welsh international rugby union player (died 1932)

Deaths

3 January – Rosser Beynon, musician, 64
19 February – Daniel Davies, Baptist preacher, 78
24 February – Joseph Jenkins Roberts, President of Liberia, son of a Welsh planter, 66
23 April (at Karlsruhe) – Frances Bunsen, painter, 85
2 May – Daniel Thomas Williams (Tydfylyn), poet and musician (born 1820)
19 July – George E. Pugh, Welsh-American politician, 53
9 August – Lady Sarah Elizabeth Hay-Williams, English-born artist and illustrator, 75 
21 August – C. W. Evan, Congregationalist minister in colonial South Australia, age unknown
9 November – John David Jenkins, philanthropist, 58
17 November – Thomas Rees (Twm Carnabwth), leader of Rebecca Riots
20 November – Robert Herbert Williams (Corfanydd), musician (born 1805)
25 December – Adrian Stephens, inventor of the steam whistle, 81

References

Wales